Kodibettu is a small village situated on the way to Peranankila.It is nearly 18 km from Udupi. This small village has a Higher and a Primary School [Vishnu moorthy high school] in which many students from local and rural areas come and study. This village has a raythara Sahakari Bank. There are a small number of shops in Kodibettu and this village has a rice mill. There are many buses to this village which travel from Udupi to Peranankila. There is a newly built district sub-jail at Anjar village within Kodibettu gram panchayat.

External links

Villages in Udupi district